Methylpropyltryptamine (MPT; N-methyl-N-propyltryptamine) is a tryptamine.  It is a homolog of methylethyltryptamine.

An analytical method for its detection has been reported.

In 2019, Chadeayne et al. published the crystal structure of MPT. The authors describe the structure as "...a single molecule in the asymmetric unit, with an indole group that demonstrates a mean deviation from planarity of 0.015 A°."

See also
 4-HO-MPT

References

Tryptamines
Tertiary amines